Harold John Davenport (19 February 1900 – 22 October 1984) was an  Australian rules footballer who played with South Melbourne in the Victorian Football League (VFL).

Notes

External links 

1900 births
1984 deaths
Australian rules footballers from Victoria (Australia)
Sydney Swans players